James Rudolph O'Malley (15 March 1904 – 27 February 1985) was an English character actor and singer who appeared in many American films and television programmes from the 1940s to 1982, using the stage name J. Pat O'Malley. He also appeared on the Broadway stage in Ten Little Indians (1944) and Dial M for Murder (1954).

The New York Times drama critic Theodore Goldsmith praised O'Malley's performance in Ten Little Indians, calling him "a rara avis, a comedian who does not gauge the success of his efforts by the number of laughs he induces at each performance".

Early years
Born into an Irish family in Burnley, Lancashire, O’Malley began his career in entertainment in 1925 as a recording artist and then as principal singer with Jack Hylton and his orchestra in the United Kingdom from 1930 to 1933. Known at that time as Pat O'Malley, he recorded more than four hundred popular songs of the day. In 1930 he sang "Amy, Wonderful Amy", a song about aviator Amy Johnson, performed by Jack Hylton's band. He began a solo recording career in 1935 in parallel with his work with Hylton. 

At the end of 1935 Hylton and O'Malley came to the United States to record with a band composed of American musicians, thus emulating Ray Noble and Al Bowlly. The venture was short-lived. O'Malley remained in the US, known professionally as J. Pat O'Malley (to avoid confusion with another film actor named Pat O'Malley); he had a long and varied acting career, including the 1943 film Lassie Come Home as "Hynes".

Television career

O'Malley guest-starred in 1951 as a sheriff on the syndicated western series, The Adventures of Kit Carson. From 1950-55, he appeared in five episodes of The Philco-Goodyear Television Playhouse. From 1951-57 he was cast in eight episodes of another anthology series, Robert Montgomery Presents. Other television work from this period include roles in Spin and Marty film (1955) and serial (1955-57) as the always-faithful ranch steward, Perkins.

In 1956 he guest-starred in "The Guilty", one of the last episodes of the NBC legal drama Justice. In 1958 he was a guest star in Peter Gunn (Season 1, Episode 3, "The Vicious Dog") as Homer Tweed.

He also appeared in the syndicated City Detective in the episode "Found in a Pawnshop" (1955). In 1960 O'Malley was cast in another syndicated series, Coronado 9. In 1959 and 1960 O'Malley portrayed a judge and a newspaper editor in three episodes of the ABC western series The Rebel as a roaming former Confederate soldier.

On January 6, 1959, O'Malley played a priest in the episode "The Secret of the Mission" on the syndicated adventure series Rescue 8. 

The same year, he guest starred on the TV Western Gunsmoke as the title character  “Print Asper” (S4E36).

O'Malley was cast as Walter Morgan in the 1959 episode "The First Gold Brick" of the NBC western series The Californians. In 1959-1960 he made eight appearances as Judge Caleb Marsh in Black Saddle. In 1959 he was cast as Dr Hardy in an early episode of Hennesey. In season 3, Episode 10 of the television series Wanted: Dead or Alive , "The Medicine Man", O'Malley played Doc. He also appeared in the role of a bank president in an episode of The Real McCoys titled "The Bank Loan", which was released January 15, 1959.

In 1960 O'Malley made guest appearances on The Tab Hunter Show,  The Law and Mr. Jones, Johnny Midnight, Johnny Staccato, Harrigan and Son, Adventures in Paradise, The Islanders, Going My Way, The Tall Man, and as Jim Phelan on Lawman episode titled "The Swamper." He made numerous guest appearances on CBS's Perry Mason, including as the defendant in the 1960 episode "The Case of the Prudent Prosecutor" and as the murderer in the 1961 episode "The Case of the Roving River". O'Malley also appeared in The Twilight Zone episode "The Chaser".

In 1961 O'Malley appeared in 3 episodes of Tales of Wells Fargo, in different roles. In the episode "The Has-Been" he had the title role, playing a fading entertainer grieving over the loss of his wife. In one scene, O'Malley sang and danced as he performed for an imaginary audience in an abandoned dance hall. Later that year he guest-starred in the television version of Bus Stop and the following year appeared in two episodes of The Twilight Zone, "The Fugitive" and "Mr. Garrity and the Graves".  He also guest-starred twice on The Lloyd Bridges Show in that series' 1962-1963 season.  He then co-starred in the 1964 episode "This Train Don't Stop Till It Gets There" of The Greatest Show on Earth.

During the 1963-1964 season O'Malley appeared in eight episodes of My Favorite Martian and returned to The Twilight Zone, playing a bit part in the episode "The Self-Improvement of Salvatore Ross". In the 1964-1965 season, he was cast in Wendy and Me. O'Malley appeared in the Hogan's Heroes episode "How to Cook a German Goose by Radar" in 1966, and the 1967 episode "D-Day at Stalag 13".  In 1966 he also appeared as Ed Breck in the episode "Win Place and Die" of the sitcom Run, Buddy, Run. He appeared occasionally as Vince in The Rounders. In the 1966 episode "The Four Dollar Law Suit" of the syndicated western series Death Valley Days, O'Malley played a lawyer. In the January 19 and January 25, 1967 episodes of Batman, he played an eccentric inventor, Pat Pending, who is robbed by Catwoman.

In 1969 O'Malley portrayed Carol Brady's father in the first episode of ABC's The Brady Bunch. The name Fleming was used in O'Malley's first two appearances on The Fugitive (Season 1, "See Hollywood And Die"; Season 3, "Crack in a Crystal Ball"). In 1973 O'Malley co-starred in the comedy A Touch of Grace. He made several appearances on Maude between 1973 and 1975; and he performed on other series such as It Takes a Thief, One Day at a Time, Emergency!, Adam-12, The Practice, Three's Company, and Taxi. O'Malley also appeared on the ABC television series Family in 1979.

O'Malley appeared three times on the ABC television series Barney Miller. In the 1975 episode "You Dirty Rat" O'Malley played Mr. Holliman, the likeable homeless man who fell asleep and spent the weekend in Siegel’s department store. In the 1981 "Rainmaker" episode, O'Malley played Walter Dooley, a traveling rainmaker hired by the NYC water department to end a drought but was arrested for setting a ritual fire in the park.

Voice work
Walt Disney engaged O'Malley to provide voices for animated films such as the Cockney coster in the "Supercalifragilisticexpialidocious" sequence in Mary Poppins (1964); Cyril Proudbottom in The Adventures of Ichabod and Mr. Toad (1949); and the role of Colonel Hathi and the vulture Buzzie in The Jungle Book (1967). His voice can be heard in Alice in Wonderland (1951), in which he performs all the character voices in "The Walrus and the Carpenter" segment (excepting Alice), including Tweedledum and Tweedledee, the Walrus, the Carpenter, and Mother Oyster. Actor Dick Van Dyke has said that O'Malley was his dialect coach on Mary Poppins, attributing his infamous Cockney accent in that film to O'Malley.

Death
O'Malley died of cardiovascular disease at his home in San Juan Capistrano on 27 February 1985, aged 80.

Selected TV and filmography

References

External links
 
 
 
 J. Pat O'Malley at The Original Mickey Mouse Club

1904 births
1985 deaths
20th-century English male actors
20th-century English singers
20th-century British male singers
Audiobook narrators
British expatriate male actors in the United States
Disney people
English male film actors
English male radio actors
English male singers
English male stage actors
English male television actors
English male voice actors
English people of Irish descent
Male actors from Lancashire
People from Burnley
Western (genre) television actors